The following lists events that happened during 2003 in Laos.

Incumbents
President: Khamtai Siphandon
Vice President: Choummaly Sayasone
Prime Minister: Bounnhang Vorachith

Events
date unknown - 2003 Lao League

References

 
Years of the 21st century in Laos
Laos
2000s in Laos
Laos